Pablo Alberto Vargas Pérez (born 16 February 1984) is a Spanish footballer who plays as a goalkeeper.

Club career
Born in Aznalcázar, Province of Seville, Vargas finished his development at local Real Betis, and made his senior debut with the B-side in the 2003–04 season, in the Segunda División B. In summer 2005 he joined another reserve team, signing with fierce rivals Sevilla Atlético.

Vargas made his professional debut on 22 September 2007, starting in a 2–2 home draw against CD Castellón in the Segunda División. He also managed to collect the odd bench appearance with the first team, in La Liga.

In late July 2009, Vargas moved to third level club CP Cacereño. He continued to compete in that tier in the following six years, representing Universidad de Las Palmas CF, Lucena CF and again Cacereño.

References

External links

1984 births
Living people
Spanish footballers
Footballers from Andalusia
Association football goalkeepers
Segunda División players
Segunda División B players
Tercera División players
Betis Deportivo Balompié footballers
Sevilla Atlético players
CP Cacereño players
Universidad de Las Palmas CF footballers
Lucena CF players